The following is a list of teams that participated on the 2014–15 World Curling Tour.

Men
As of September 13, 2014

Women
As of September 13, 2014

References
World Curling Tour: Men's teams
World Curling Tour: Women's teams

External links
World Curling Tour: Home

Teams
2014 in curling
2015 in curling
World Curling Tour teams